Nancey D. Harrington (born November 8, 1953) is an American former politician.

Harrington was born in Waynesboro, Pennsylvania. She was appointed to the Kansas Senate's 26th district in December 1994, following the resignation of Todd Tiahrt. She won two elections in her own right as a Republican candidate in 1996 and 2000, and resigned her office in 2003.

References

1953 births
Living people
20th-century American women politicians
20th-century American politicians
21st-century American women politicians
21st-century American politicians
Women state legislators in Kansas
Republican Party Kansas state senators
People from Clearwater, Kansas
People from Goddard, Kansas
People from Waynesboro, Pennsylvania